Bertram Lytell (February 24, 1885 – September 28, 1954) was an American actor in theater and film during the silent film era and early talkies. He starred in romantic, melodrama, and adventure films.

Background

Born in New York City, Lytell was the son of actor, author, and producer William H. Lytell and Blanche Mortimer. His mother was an actress before she married, and her father and grandfather were actors. Lytell left Upper Canada College at age 16 to become an actor.

Lytell's acting debut came with the Columbia Stock Company in Newark, New Jersey, when he was 17 years old. He went on to appear with stock theater companies in Boston, Honolulu, Los Angeles, New Orleans, and Rochester, in addition to heading his own stock troupes in Albany, New York, and San Francisco. He appeared with Marie Dressler in her 1914 Broadway play, A MIX-UP. He also performed in vaudeville in the 1920s with the one-act play The Valiant.

In 1917, Lytell made his film debut starring as Michael Lanyard in The Lone Wolf. He subsequently made four Lone Wolf sequels, ending with The Last of the Lone Wolf (1930). He also starred as Boston Blackie in Boston Blackie's Little Pal (1918) and Blackie's Redemption (1919).

On old-time radio, Lytell had the title role in Alias Jimmy Valentine – a role he had played in the 1920 film of the same name, and was host of Bert Lytell Dramas and Stage Door Canteen.

His younger brother Wilfred Lytell (1891–1954) also became a stage and screen actor. Bert Lytell married the silent film actress Claire Windsor in 1925; they divorced in 1927. Like many other silent screen stars, Lytell's career collapsed after the advent of talking pictures. He worked on NBC daytime shows in the early 1950s while he was Shepherd (President) of the actors club The Lambs from 1947 to 1952. Lytell was named an Immortal Lamb.

Lytell died in New York City, aged 69. His brother Wilfred died 18 days before. He has a star at 6417 Hollywood Avenue in the Motion Picture section of the Hollywood Walk of Fame.

Selected filmography

 The Lone Wolf (1917) – Michael Lanyard
 Empty Pockets (1918) – Dr. Clinton Worthing
 The Trail to Yesterday (1918) – Ned 'Dakota' Keegles
 No Man's Land (1918, also co-wrote scenario) – Garrett Cope
 Boston Blackie's Little Pal (1918) – Boston Blackie
 Unexpected Places (1918) – Dick Holloway
 Hitting the High Spots (1918, also co-wrote scenario) – Bob Durland
 The Spender (1919) – Dick Bisbee
 Faith (1919) – George Farrelly
 Blind Man's Eyes (1919) – Hugh Overton, aka Philip D. Eaton
 Blackie's Redemption (1919) – Boston Blackie
 The Lion's Den (1919) – Reverend Sam Webster
 One-Thing-at-a-Time O'Day (1919) – Stradivarius O'Day
 Easy to Make Money (1919) – James 'Jimmy' Frederick Slocum Jr.
 Lombardi, Ltd. (1919) – Tito Lambardi
 The Right of Way (1920) – Charley Steele
 Alias Jimmy Valentine (1920) – Lee Randall / Jimmy Valentine
 The Price of Redemption (1920) – Leigh Dering
 The Misleading Lady (1920) – Jack Craigen
 A Message from Mars (1921) – Horace Parker
 The Man Who (1921) – Bedford Mills
 A Trip to Paradise (1921) – 'Curley' Flynn
 Alias Ladyfingers (1921) – Robert Ashe – Ladyfingers
 A Trip to Paradise (1921, an adaptation of Liliom)
 The Idle Rich (1921) – Samuel Weatherbee
 The Right That Failed (1922) – Johnny Duffey
 A Trip to Paramountown (1922, Documentary short) – Himself
 The Face Between (1922) – Tommy Carteret Sr.
 Sherlock Brown (1922) – William Brown
 To Have and to Hold (1922) – Captain Ralph Percy
 Kick In (1922) – Chick Hewes
 Rupert of Hentzau (1923) – King of Ruritania / Rudolph Rassendyll
 The Meanest Man in the World (1923) – Richard Clark
 The Eternal City (1923) – David Rossi
 A Son of the Sahara (1924) – Raoul Le Breton
 Sandra (1924) – David Waring
 Born Rich (1924) – Jimmy Fairfax
 The Boomerang (1925) – Dr. Sumner
 Steele of the Royal Mounted (1925) – Philip Steele
 Eve's Lover (1925) – Baron Geraldo Maddox
 Never the Twain Shall Meet (1925) – Dan Pritchard
 The Sporting Life (1925) – Lord Woodstock
 The Ship of Souls (1925) – Langley Barnes
 Lady Windermere's Fan (1925) – Lord Windermere
 The Gilded Butterfly (1926) – Brian Anestry
 The Lone Wolf Returns (1926) – Michael Lanyard / The Lone Wolf
 That Model from Paris (1926) – Robert Richmond
 Obey The Law (1926) – Phil Schuyler
 The First Night (1927) – Dr. Richard Bard
 Alias the Lone Wolf (1927) – Michael Lanyard / The Lone Wolf
 Women's Wares (1927) – Robert Crane
 On Trial (1928) – Robert Strickland
 The Lone Wolf's Daughter (1929) – Michael Lanyard / The Lone Wolf
 The Last of the Lone Wolf (1930) – Michael Lanyard
 Brothers (1930) – Bob Naughton / Eddie Connolly
 The Stolen Jools (1931) – Joe Strickland
 Stage Door Canteen (1943) – Canteen Master of Ceremonies

References

External links

Bert Lytell at Virtual History

1885 births
1954 deaths
American male film actors
American male silent film actors
20th-century American male actors
Male actors from New York City
The Lambs presidents
Vaudeville performers
Presidents of the Actors' Equity Association